Trichodiadema orientale is a succulent plant of the genus Trichodiadema, widespread in the arid areas of the Eastern Cape Province, South Africa.

References

orientale
Taxa named by Louisa Bolus